Kerecsend is a village in Heves County, Northern Hungary Region, Hungary.

Geography
The village is located on the northern part  of the Great Hungarian Plain, 
14 km south from Eger in Heves county.

Communications
Kerecsend is on Road 3 and here starts the Road 25.

Sights to visit
 Church

References

External links

  in Hungarian

 
 
Populated places in Heves County